Heinemannia albidorsella is a species of moth of the family Elachistidae. It is found in southern France and on Corsica and Sardinia.

The wingspan is 13–16 mm. Adults are on wing from May to the beginning of June.

References

External links
Lepiforum e. V.

Moths described in 1877
Elachistidae
Moths of Europe